A supergiant is a massive and luminous star, including:
 Blue supergiant star, a hot supergiant
 Yellow supergiant star, a supergiant with a temperature similar to the sun
 Red supergiant star, a cool supergiant

Supergiant may also refer to:
 Supergiant Games, a video game development company
 Super Giant, a Japanese superhero
 Alicella gigantea, the supergiant Amphipod
 Rising Pune Supergiant, a cricket team in the Indian Premier League
 Type-cD galaxy, a supergiant elliptical galaxy
 Supergiant (comics), a fictional character in the Marvel Universe